The 2019 Americas Rugby Championship is the fourth series of the Americas Rugby Championship, the top level rugby union competition for Americas nations.

Participants

Table

Fixtures

The tournament was played in a round-robin format, with each team playing the five others once. The fixtures were announced on 5 November 2018.

Week 1

Notes:
 Francisco Pizarro, Matías Dittus, Nicolás Ovalle, Javier Carrasco, Javier Eissmann, Jaden Laing, Christian Huerta, Gonzalo Lara, Augusto Böhme and Julio Blanc (all Chile) and Tadhg Leader (USA) made their international debuts.
 With his try in this match, the USA's Joe Taufete'e tied Ireland's Keith Wood for the most career Test tries by a player in the tight five with 15. Taufete'e reached the mark in his 20th international appearance, compared to 63 for Wood.

Notes:

Notes:

Week 2

Notes:
 Marcelo Huerta, Camilo Sánchez and Mauricio Gómez (Chile) made their international debuts.

Notes:

Notes:Theo Sauder was originally named in the starting team m pulling out due to injury during the warm up. Nick Blevins coming into the starting team & Giuseppe du Toit coming onto the bench.

Week 3

Notes:

Notes:
Joaquín Jaunsolo, Santiago Civetta, Santiago Piñeyrúa, Mateo Mari, and Ignacio Rodríguez (all Uruguay) made their international debuts.

Notes:

Week 4

Notes:

Notes:
 The USA's Joe Taufete'e scored three tries to take sole possession of the record for most career Test tries by a player in the tight five. After this match, Taufete'e had 18 career Test tries.

Notes:

Week 5

Notes:

Notes:

Statistics

Most points

Most tries

Updated after Week 5.

Squads

References

International rugby union competitions
Americas Rugby Championship
2019 rugby union tournaments for national teams
2019 in Canadian rugby union
2019 in Chilean sport
2019 in Brazilian sport
2019 in Uruguayan sport
2019 in American rugby union
2019 in Argentine rugby union
2019 in North American rugby union
2019 in South American rugby union
Americas Rugby Championship
Americas Rugby Championship
Americas Rugby Championship
Americas Rugby Championship
Americas Rugby Championship
Americas Rugby Championship